Chaetodon dolosus, the African butterflyfish, is a species of marine ray-finned fish, a butterflyfish of the family Chaetodontidae. It is found in the Western Indian Ocean, at depths from 40–200 metres (13–66 ft.  It can grow up to 15 centimetres (6 in) in length.

References

dolosus
Marine fauna of East Africa
Fish of Madagascar
Fauna of the Mascarene Islands
Fish described in 1923